Miles Corbet (1595–1662) was an English politician, recorder of Yarmouth and Regicide.

Life
He was the son of Sir Thomas Corbet of Sprowston, Norfolk and the younger brother of Sir John Corbet, 1st Baronet, MP for Great Yarmouth from 1625 to 1629. He entered Lincoln's Inn and was appointed Recorder of Great Yarmouth.

Miles succeeded his brother John as MP for Yarmouth, England, serving from 1640 to 1653, and signed Charles I's death warrant.
In 1644 he was made clerk of the Court of Wards. In 1649 Oliver Cromwell granted the estate of Malahide Castle to Corbet after the Cromwellian Conquest of Ireland. The castle was returned to its ancestral owners in 1660 with the restoration of Charles II. In 1655 Corbet was appointed Chief Baron of the Irish Exchequer.

After the Restoration of Charles II of England in 1660, all the 59 men who had signed the death warrant for Charles I were in grave danger as they were considered regicides. Miles Corbet, like many of the 59, fled England. He went to the Netherlands where he thought he would be safe. However, with two other regicides (John Okey and John Barkstead) he was arrested by the English ambassador to the Netherlands, Sir George Downing, and returned to England under guard. After a trial, he was found guilty and then executed on 19 April 1662. In his dying speech he said:

References

Attribution

External links
 The former home of Miles Corbet
 

1595 births
1662 deaths
Corbett, Miles
English MPs 1628–1629
English MPs 1640 (April)
English MPs 1640–1648
English MPs 1648–1653
Executed regicides of Charles I
People executed by Stuart England by hanging, drawing and quartering
Executed people from Norfolk
People executed under the Stuarts for treason against England
People executed at Tyburn
Members of Lincoln's Inn
English politicians convicted of crimes
Chief Barons of the Irish Exchequer